Leonard George Stubbs (born 24 October 1928) is a former English cricketer. Stubbs was a right-handed batsman. He was born in Calcutta, Bengal Presidency in the British Raj (today Kolkata, India).

Stubbs made his debut Hertfordshire in the 1967 Minor Counties Championship against Cambridgeshire. He played Minor counties cricket for Hertfordshire from 1967 to 1971, making 39 Minor Counties Championship appearances. He made his List A debut for the county against Devon in the 1969 Gillette Cup. He made two further List A appearances, against Glamorgan in the 2nd round of the same competition, and against Surrey in the 1st round of the 1971 Gillette Cup. In his three List A matches, he scored 32 runs at an average of 10.66, with a high score of 18.

References

External links
Len Stubbs at ESPNcricinfo
Len Stubbs at CricketArchive

1938 births
Living people
Cricketers from Kolkata
English cricketers
Hertfordshire cricketers